The Electoral district of Rodney was a Victorian Legislative Assembly electorate in Northern Victoria.

The Rodney District covered an area of 7,808 square kilometres, including the towns of Echuca, Rochester, Nathalia, Cohuna, Heathcote, Gunbower, Kyabram, Rushworth and Stanhope.

At inception in 1856, the district boundaries include the Murray River and Goulburn River in the north and east; and the Campaspe River in the west. By 1956 the district had expanded further westward to include Cohuna.

In 2014, it was abolished and became part of the electoral district of Murray Plains.

Electoral history
Until its abolition, Rodney was one of only four electorates (along with Brighton, Richmond and Williamstown) to have been contested at every election since 1856. It was held by the Victorian Farmers Union/Country/National Party from 1917. John Allan, who was the first Country Party Member for the district, became Australia's first Country Party Premier in 1924.

In the 2006 election, Paul Weller won the seat for the National Party with a margin of 4.39% against the Liberals. The Liberal Party did not run in this electorate in the 2010 election, leaving the Nationals with a much higher lead against the other parties.

Members for Rodney

Election results

See also
 Parliaments of the Australian states and territories
 List of members of the Victorian Legislative Assembly

External links
 Electorate profile: Rodney District, Victorian Electoral Commission

References

Former electoral districts of Victoria (Australia)
1856 establishments in Australia
2014 disestablishments in Australia